The 1962–63 Michigan Wolverines men's basketball team represented the University of Michigan in intercollegiate college basketball during the 1962–63 season.  The team played its home games at Fielding H. Yost Field House (renamed Yost Ice Arena in 1973) on the school's campus in Ann Arbor, Michigan. Under the direction of head coach Dave Strack, the team finished tied for fourth in the Big Ten Conference and failed to get an invitation to either the 1963 NCAA Men's Division I Basketball Tournament or the 1963 National Invitation Tournament.  Tom Cole served as team captain, while Bill Buntin earned team MVP.

That season, the team defeated one of the three ranked opponents that it faced (#6 Illinois 84–81 on March 2, 1963, at home). The team was unranked the entire season in the Associated Press Top Ten Poll, and it also ended the season unranked in the final UPI Coaches' Poll.

During the season, Buntin led the Big Ten conference in rebounding with 15.4 per conference game. As a team, the Wolverines led the Big Ten with a 49.0 rebound per game average.

It also set the single-season record of 1320, but that was broken each of the following two seasons. Buntin set the current school record (since the 1959–60 season) for consecutive point-rebound double doubles with a streak of 14 games. He also surpassed Scott Maentz's 1960 single-season total of 12 double doubles with a total of 23, which stood as a school record until Phil Hubbard posted 24 in 1977.

Team players drafted into the NBA
Two players from this team were selected in the NBA Draft.

References

Michigan
Michigan Wolverines men's basketball seasons
Michigan Wolverines basketball
Michigan Wolverines basketball